Lone Star Township may refer to:

 Lone Star Township, Rush County, Kansas
 Lone Star Township, Tripp County, South Dakota

Township name disambiguation pages